Filippo Fabbri (born 7 January 2002) is a Sammarinese professional footballer who plays as a centre-back for Italian  club Olbia and the San Marino national team.

Club career
On 6 July 2022, Serie C club Olbia announced the signing of Fabbri on a two-year deal.

International career
Fabbri has represented San Marino in different age level teams.

He received his first call up for the San Marino senior side in March 2021. He made his debut on 28 March 2021 in a World Cup qualifier against Hungary.

Career statistics

Club

International

Scores and results list San Marino's goal tally first, score column indicates score after each Fabbri goal.

References

External links
 
 

2002 births
Living people
People from the City of San Marino
Association football central defenders
Sammarinese footballers
San Marino youth international footballers
San Marino under-21 international footballers
San Marino international footballers
Serie D players
Cesena F.C. players
S.S.D. Correggese Calcio 1948 players
Forlì F.C. players
Olbia Calcio 1905 players
Sammarinese expatriate footballers
Sammarinese expatriate sportspeople in Italy
Expatriate footballers in Italy